Penzhina Bay (Penzhinskaya guba) is a long and narrow bay off the northwestern coast of Kamchatka, Russia.

Geography
Penzhina Bay is the upper right arm of Shelikhov Bay in the northeastern corner of the Sea of Okhotsk.  It is bounded on the east by the Kamchatka Peninsula and on the west by the Taygonos Peninsula, which separates it from Gizhigin Bay. The bay is entered between Cape Taygonos (60°34' N, 160°11' E) to the west and Cape Bozhedomova (60°18' N, 161°53' E) to the east. Cape Povorotnyy lies to the east-northeast of Cape Taygonos. It is about 300 km (186 mi) long and 65 km (40 mi) wide.  Near its middle, two peninsulas narrow it to 30 km (18.6 mi), forming The Gorlo. There is ice in the bay from October to May. It has the highest tides of any bay on the Pacific Ocean: 9 m (29.5 ft), 12.9 m (42.3 ft) maximum, versus 17 m (56 ft) in the Bay of Fundy. Its basin is very thinly populated.

The river Penzhina flows into the head of the bay. It is 713 km (443 mi) long and flows east, then south, then southwest to reach the bay.

History

The town of Penzhina was located on the middle Penzhina River and was visited by George Kennan in 1866. The major tributary of the Penzhina is the Aklan, Oklan or Khayakha River which flows southeast and joins the Penzhina about 50 miles from its mouth.

In 1669 the Russians built the ostrog of Aklansk, which was used to subdue the local Koryaks and was an important base on the route south from Anadyrsk to the Kamchatka peninsula before the sea route from Okhotsk opened up. It was attacked by the Koryaks several times and later abandoned.

Between 1849 and 1900, American whaleships hunted bowhead whales in the bay. On 11 August 1867, the barque Stella (270 tons), of New Bedford, Capt. Ebenezer F. Nye, was wrecked on Krayny on the western side of the bay. Two men were killed as the barque was smashed to pieces. The rest of the crew were rescued by several nearby vessels.

During a five-day period in late September 1968, the Soviet factory ship Vladivostok and its fleet of whale catchers illegally caught sixty-six balaenids (likely bowheads) in the bay.

See also 
 Penzhin Tidal Power Plant Project

References

Location
Penzhin Bay

Bays of the Sea of Okhotsk
Bays of Magadan Oblast
Bays of Kamchatka Krai
Shipwrecks in the Sea of Okhotsk